Ashbee is a surname. Notable people with the surname include:

 Barry Ashbee (1939–1977), Canadian ice hockey player
 Charles Robert Ashbee (1863–1942), English designer and entrepreneur
 Henry Spencer Ashbee (1834–1900), English merchant, book collector, writer, and bibliographer
 Ian Ashbee (born 1976), English footballer
 Paul Ashbee (1918–2009), British archaeologist
 W. N. Ashbee (1852–1919), British railway architect

See also 
 Ashby (disambiguation)

English-language surnames